Ashu Dani (born 3 October 1974) is an Indian former cricketer. He played 49 first-class matches for Delhi between 1994 and 2001.

See also
 List of Delhi cricketers

References

External links
 

1974 births
Living people
Indian cricketers
Delhi cricketers
Cricketers from Delhi